A group of people residing in the centre part of Chakhesang are called Centre Chakhesang.
It comprises seven villages, namely Porba, Sakraba, Gidemi, Pholami and Upper Khomi, Middle Khomi, Lower Khomi

Naga people